Luis Orlando de los Angeles Mora Padilla (born 29 January 1960) is a Costa Rican long-distance runner. He competed in the men's 5000 metres at the 1984 Summer Olympics.

References

1960 births
Living people
Athletes (track and field) at the 1984 Summer Olympics
Costa Rican male long-distance runners
Olympic athletes of Costa Rica
Sportspeople from San José, Costa Rica
Central American Games gold medalists for Costa Rica
Central American Games medalists in athletics
Central American Games bronze medalists for Costa Rica
20th-century Costa Rican people
21st-century Costa Rican people